Luigi Mascolo (born January 7, 1927), was an Italian former Catholic priest who converted to and became a bishop of the Brazilian Catholic Apostolic Church (ICAB), an independent Catholic Church in Brazil.

Biography
Mascolo was born in Irsina, Italy, in January 1927. After narrowly escaping deportation to a Nazi forced labor camp during World War II, he studied in Rome and was later ordained a priest of the Diocese of Matera-Irsina in 1957, before being sent to Brazil as a Fidei Donum missionary. Struggling to find his niche in Brazil, he converted to the Brazilian Catholic Apostolic Church and was consecrated as an  bishop in 1964 by Antidio Jose Vargas, becoming 's bishop in Rio de Janeiro and later national leader of ICAB during the 1970s (among other acts he consecrated the first bishop and Patriarch of the Argentine Catholic Apostolic Church, Leonardo Morizio Dominguez, in 1972). According to Roman Catholic Canon Law his actions against the Catholic Church resulted in automatic excommunication by the Vatican.

References

External links 
Website of the Brazilian Catholic Apostolic Church

Bishops of Independent Catholic denominations
Year of death missing
People from the Province of Matera
People excommunicated by the Catholic Church
Italian Roman Catholic missionaries
Roman Catholic missionaries in Brazil
1927 births
Italian emigrants to Brazil